Ellobiida is an order of gastropods belonging to the class Gastropoda.

Families:
 Ellobiidae
 Otinidae
 Trimusculidae

References

Heterobranchia
Mollusc orders